Canning Bridge is a traffic bridge which is the most downstream crossing of the Canning River in the city of Perth, Western Australia. The bridge is a part of Canning Highway, and it connects the suburbs of Como and Applecross. It is located near the Canning Bridge railway station.

History 

There have been four different structures at the present site.

First bridge: 1849 

The first bridge was designed in 1846 by Henry Trigg, then Superintendent of Public Works.

Construction on the bridge was not commenced until 1849 because the original tenders were too costly. The bridge was built by Solomon Cook, costing £425. The bridge served as a vital traffic link between Fremantle, Perth and Guildford.

Second bridge: 1867 

Flooding in the Swan and Canning Rivers in 1862 damaged the Canning and Helena Bridges, as well as The Causeway. As a result, a new Canning Bridge was built in 1867 by convicts.

Third bridge: 1908 

Due to poor maintenance, the second bridge slowly deteriorated. A fire damaged the structure, and since the road served as a critical traffic link, funding was provided for a new bridge in 1907 and 1908. The new bridge was built in 1908 at a cost of £2,023, and was a sturdier construction. It was located south east of the present bridge.

During the Great Depression, between 1930 and 1933, bushland on the eastern bank of the Canning River at Canning Bridge hosted many homeless families in bushland camps.

Current structure: 1939 

Construction on a replacement for the third bridge began in 1938. The new bridge, which cost £24,830, was opened in December 1939.

Due to the outbreak of World War II, the third bridge was not immediately demolished, in case of damage to the new bridge by enemy attack. The third bridge was kept in place until the late 1940s.

The 1939 bridge remains standing today, however it has been extensively modified since it was first opened and only carries Eastbound traffic on Canning Highway. In 1958, another pile-driven timber bridge was constructed alongside the existing 1939 bridge on its upstream (Southern) side,
effectively doubling the traffic capacity of the structure. This newer structure featured a fishing platform below, but in most other respects was very similar to the original carriageway.

1958 saw the shortening of the 1939 (downstream) bridge on its Eastern end by 3 spans to accommodate an on-ramp to the then-new Kwinana Freeway. Then, between 1965 and 1966, both the downstream and upstream bridges were widened on their outer sides by an extra 2 piles, to give a total of 8 piles per pier on each bridge. At this time, the fishing platform underneath the 1958 (upstream) bridge was also extended and modified.

1976 saw the installation of a reinforced concrete overlay onto the 1939 (downstream) bridge's deck, and the same was performed on the 1958 (upstream) bridge in 1984. The original karri timber halfcaps in the 1939 bridge's structure were replaced by steel in 1994-1995 due to termite damage. Other substructure repairs were also carried out at this time, and the Eastern abutment of the 1958 bridge was reinforced with concrete.

In 1997, the reinforced concrete overlay on the bridge decks was replaced, and was expected to help lengthen the lifespan of the structure by 40 years. Further reinforced concrete was used in 1998–1999 to stop further damage to the bridge's superstructure.

Raffles Hotel 

The location of Canning Bridge on the road from Fremantle to Perth and Guildford made it a suitable location for accommodation and refreshments. As a result, in 1896 the Canning Bridge Hotel was built near the bridge on its western (Applecross) side.
This building was extensively upgraded in 1939 with a distinctive art-deco facade designed by architect William G. Bennett to coincide with the construction of the current bridge. The building was renamed the Raffles Hotel after the hotel of the same name in Singapore.

Apart from its status as "the epitome" of Perth's social scene in the 1940s and 1950s, the Raffles later became noted for its animated neon billboards advertising beer. During the 1970s and 1980s the Raffles was notable for its live music attracting the most popular local and interstate acts.

In 2002, the site was sold to construction company Multiplex, which proceeded to redevelop the site into a 17-storey apartment tower. As part of the planning permissions, the art-deco 1939 building was retained and renovated.

Heritage status
In March 2012 the bridge attained status on the Western Australian State Heritage list.

References

Further reading

External links
 

Road bridges in Perth, Western Australia
Canning River (Western Australia)
State Register of Heritage Places in the City of Melville
State Register of Heritage Places in the City of South Perth
Applecross, Western Australia